Domeli is a village and union council of Sohawa Tehsil, Jhelum District in the Punjab province of Pakistan.

Location 
Geographical coordinates of the village in decimal degrees are 33.017 in latitude and 73.350 in longitude.

References 

Populated places in Tehsil Sohawa
Union councils of Sohawa Tehsil 

Villages in Sohawa Tehsil